Live XXX TV was an interactive adult chat television channel aired in many western European nations on Sky. The channel was shown between the hours of 21:00 and 05:30 each night, with a subscription required after 23:30.

History
The channel started on Sky Channel 995. When Sky's channels were rearranged in February 2006, it moved to channel 911 and was renamed Sex Station. The channel returned to its original name in 2008, moving to channel 957. On 26 June 2009, the channel was removed from Sky's Electronic Programme Guide. The reason for its removal is unknown.

Concept
The channel was usually broadcast live, featuring two women on the main screen, with between two and four "sub-screens" on the right hand side showing additional women labelled "Babe number #". The women on the main screen encouraged viewers to call the (premium rate) telephone numbers to speak with one of the women in the sub-screens while they posed in a sexually provocative way. They also encouraged viewers to send text messages (again at a premium rate), which they might read out, and performed acts usually of a sexually orientated nature. The women on the main screen also took telephone calls on given nights and occasionally switched positions from the main screen to a sub-screen.
For the first hour, the women usually wore bikinis. They could flash their breasts, but usually kept their bikinis on—such brief upper-body nudity is permitted by the UK watershed regulations. Between 22:00 and 23:00 the bikini tops were removed. At 23:00 a warning message was shown to inform viewers the subsequent part of the show may be sexually explicit, and the women on the main screen usually removed their bikini bottoms. Alternatively, the channel would go full-screen with all the women together on one large bed; although those engaged in calls with phone-in viewers would continue their conversation with the viewers listening-in on the woman's side of the conversation, which might be sexually explicit.

FTG
One aspect that was unique to the channel compared to its UK peers was the FTG feature. At around 23:28, just before the channel switched to the subscription-only service for the rest of the night, the main screen would expand to fill the whole screen, all the women would gather on the main screen and remove their thongs exposing their pubic area to the camera. The feature was promoted as FTG - "Flash the gash". The channel then showed a blue screen for non-subscription viewers, or continued on eventually to the late show for subscribed viewers of the channel.
From 2006, the FTG feature was phased out for unspecified reasons, although incoming text messages continued to make references to FTG.

See also
Sex Station
Babestation
 Pornography in the United Kingdom

References

British pornographic television channels
Adult chat (television)
Defunct television channels in the United Kingdom
Television channels and stations disestablished in 2009
Television channels and stations established in 2005